Sabiceeae is a tribe of flowering plants in the family Rubiaceae and contains about 164 species in 7 genera. Its representatives are found in tropical Africa, Madagascar, Sri Lanka, and from Mexico to tropical America. The genus Sabicea is one of the rare genera in Rubiaceae that occurs both in tropical Africa and tropical America.

Genera 
Currently accepted names

 Hekistocarpa Hook.f. (1 sp)
 Pentaloncha Hook.f. (2 sp)
 Sabicea Aubl. (149 sp)
 Stipularia P.Beauv. (2 sp)
 Tamridaea Thulin & B.Bremer (1 sp)
 Temnopteryx Hook.f. (1 sp)
 Virectaria Bremek. (8 sp)

Synonyms

 Ecpoma K.Schum. = Sabicea
 Paiva Vell. = Sabicea
 Phyteumoides Smeathman ex DC. = Virectaria
 Pseudosabicea N.Hallé = Sabicea
 Schizostigma Arn. ex Meisn. = Sabicea
 Schwenkfelda Schreb. = Sabicea
 Virecta Afzel. ex Sm. = Virectaria

References 

 
Ixoroideae tribes